Sebastián Marcelo Malandra (born 31 January 1985) was an Argentine footballer.

Born in Piamonte, San Martín Department, Santa Fe, Malandra began playing youth football with local side Club Atlético Colón. He would make his Primera División Argentina debut with Colón. A brief spell with Primera side Club Atlético San Martín (San Juan) followed, before Malandra dropped down to play for second division clubs (Ben Hur and Olimpo) and then a pair of Chilean sides (Ñublense and Cúrico). Malandra returned from abroad and joined a series of lower division clubs (Sportivo Belgrano, Desamparados, Huracán, Sarmiento de Resistencia, Sportivo Italiano, Deportivo Madryn, Excursionistas, and Piamonte).

References

 Profile at BDFA 
 

1985 births
Living people
Argentine footballers
Argentine expatriate footballers
Club Atlético Colón footballers
San Martín de San Juan footballers
Club Sportivo Ben Hur players
Olimpo footballers
Ñublense footballers
Curicó Unido footballers
Sarmiento de Resistencia footballers
Expatriate footballers in Chile
Association football midfielders
Footballers from Santa Fe, Argentina